Thomas Gerard may refer to:

Politicians
Thomas Gerard (MP for Norwich) (fl. 1390) for Norwich
Thomas Gerard (MP for Lancashire) (died 1416), represented Lancashire
Thomas Gerard, 1st Baron Gerard (died 1618), English politician and peer
Sir Thomas Gerard, 1st Baronet (1560–1621), English politician
Sir Thomas Gerard, 2nd Baronet (1584–1630), English landowner and politician

Others
Thomas Gerard (reformer) (died 1540), English Protestant
Thomas Gerard (historian) (1593-1634), of Trent, historian of Dorset

See also

Thomas Gerrard (disambiguation)